Capperia meyi is a moth of the family Pterophoridae. It is known from Luzon.

The wingspan is about 20 mm. Adults are on wing in November.

The host plant is unknown, but presumed to be, like for all other known species in the genus Capperia, in the family Labiatae.

Etymology
The species is named after Dr W. Mey, one of the collectors and an investigator of microlepidoptera.

References

Oxyptilini
Moths described in 2003